So Close may refer to:

Movies 
 So Close (film), a Hong Kong action film

Music

Albums
 So Close (album), a 1993 album by Dina Carroll

Songs
 "So Close" (Hall & Oates song)
 "So Close" (Jennette McCurdy song)
"So Close" (Enchanted song)
 "So Close" (NOTD and Felix Jaehn song)
 "So Close" (Six by Seven song)
 "So Close", by Alice in Chains from the self-titled album
 "So Close", by Bethany Dillon from Stop & Listen
 "So Close", by Brandon Lake with Amanda Cook from Help!
 "So Close", by Diana Ross from Silk Electric
 "So Close", by Evanescence from Evanescence EP
 "So Close", by Raven from Glow

See also
 So Close, So Far, a 2005 Iranian film
 "So Close, So Far" (Hoobastank song)